Calgary-Fort was a provincial electoral district in Alberta, Canada, mandated to return a single member to the Legislative Assembly of Alberta using the first past the post method of voting from 1997 to 2019.

History
The Riding covers some of the cities older blue collar neighbourhoods including Forest Lawn, Dover, Inglewood, Lynwood Ridge, Ogden, Erin Woods and the Foothills Industrial Park. The riding was largely broken with three distinct residential sections surrounded by industrial areas.

The riding suffered from a number of environmental problems in recent years caused by heavy industry. Soil contamination from the old oil refinery in Lynwood Ridge has created a ghost town of houses in limbo. Canadian Pacific Railway has also been to blame for heavy soil contamination affecting residents along the tracks in Ogden by a chemical known as Trichloroethylene used as a track degreaser. In 1999 the Hub Oil refinery just east of Erin Woods exploded raining contamination on the neighbourhood. The riding also has a quarantined site where the Inglewood Refinery used to be for soil contamination problems.

The riding had been a Progressive Conservative stronghold and was held continuously by PC MLA Wayne Cao since its creation in 1997 until the 2015 election, when the riding was won by New Democrat Joe Ceci.

Boundary history
The electoral district was created in the 1996 boundary re-distribution out of Calgary-East and named after the historical Fort Calgary.

The riding had significant changes in the 2010 Alberta boundary re-distribution, and was expanded to meet the new boundaries of the City of Calgary and gained some rural portions that had belonged to Foothills-Rocky View. The electoral district also gained the neighborhoods of Ramsay that was previously in Calgary-Egmont and East Village which was in Calgary-Buffalo. The riding also expanded south into industrial land that was formerly part of Calgary-Hays.

The Calgary-Fort electoral district was dissolved in the 2017 electoral boundary re-distribution int Calgary-Peigan ahead of the 2019 Alberta general election.

Electoral history

The electoral district of Calgary-Fort was created in the boundary re-distribution of 1997. The district covers central southeast Calgary and was carved primarily from Calgary-East. Progressive Conservative Wayne Cao won the district in the first election held in 1997 with just under half the popular vote.

Cao would run for his second term in 2001 and win a landslide victory winning almost 69% of the popular vote over a crowded field of eight candidates. He was re-elected in 2004 with a significantly reduced margin of victory taking just over half the popular vote.

Cao stood for a fourth term in the 2008 election and for the first time since 1997 he won less than half of the popular vote in one of the lowest voter turnout races in the province. Cao would retire prior to the 2015 Alberta general election which saw New Democrat and former Calgary Councillor Joe Ceci elected in Calgary-Fort.

Legislature results

Senate nominee results

2004 Senate nominee election district results

Voters had the option of selecting four candidates on the ballot.

2012 Senate nominee election district results

Student vote results

2004 election

On November 19, 2004 a student vote was conducted at participating Alberta schools to parallel the 2004 Alberta general election results. The vote was designed to educate students and simulate the electoral process for persons who had not yet reached the legal majority. The vote was conducted in 80 of the 83 provincial electoral districts, with students voting for actual election candidates. Schools with a large student body who reside in another electoral district had the option to vote for candidates outside of the electoral district than where they were physically located.

2012 election

See also
List of Alberta provincial electoral districts

References

Further reading

External links 
Elections Alberta
The Legislative Assembly of Alberta
Electoral Divisions Act, SA 2003, c E-4.1 on CanLII
Riding Map for Calgary Fort
Government of Alberta Demographics Calgary Fort
Student Vote Alberta
Millican-Ogden still living with contamination FFWD Weekly January 25, 2005

Former provincial electoral districts of Alberta
Politics of Calgary